John Dirks may refer to:
 John Dirks (physician)
 John Dirks (cartoonist)